is an autobahn in Germany that connects the Ruhr area in the west to Berlin in the east. The A 2 starts at the junction with the A3 near the western city of Oberhausen, passes through the north of the Ruhr valley, through the Münsterland and into Ostwestfalen, crossing the former inner German border and continuing through the Magdeburger Börde to merge into the Berliner Ring shortly before reaching Berlin. Major cities such as Magdeburg, Braunschweig, Hannover and Dortmund are situated very close to the A 2. The A 2 is one of the most important autobahns, connecting several large industrial areas with each other.

The A 2 was modified in the late 1990s, and completely rebuilt in the former East Germany. All of the A 2 has 3 travel lanes and a breakdown lane in each direction.

History

The highway was planned between September 1933 and December 1934 by the construction departments of the company Reichsautobahn in Düsseldorf, Hanover and Merseburg. As a connection of the Rhine-Ruhr region, the highway was deliberately planned in the northern area of the Ruhr area, since the mining migrated to the north and at the same time wanted to avoid the mountain subsidence areas. In the area Ostwestfalen one followed the settlement priorities. In the area of Hanover, it was natural to pass the motorway via a short route south of the city. As Hanover was at that time one of the hubs of German air traffic and the airport was in the north of the city, it was decided, however, for a northern bypass of the city. In addition, there was a freight yard in the north, an industrial area was planned and the soil conditions were better. Between Berlin and Hanover there were three possible variants, which were examined. The northern one was supposed to lead over Stendal and to the north to the Berliner Ring. It was the shortest route for the proposed extension in the direction of Szczecin and Königsberg dar. However, the disadvantage was that the crossed area was sparsely populated and already the railroad was the main carrier. The middle variant touched Genthin and Brandenburg on the Havel and aimed at the center of Berlin. Again, the area was sparsely populated and already developed by the railway. Another difficulty was that there were numerous lakes and bogs, which would have made construction difficult. The southern variant, which was finally built, led through the most densely populated area and opened the possibility of an extension to Wroclaw or Frankfurt (Oder) and Warsaw. It was planned to build two 3.75 m wide lanes per direction of travel with a 4.2 m wide median strip along the entire route. With the Betonleitstreifen and the banquets, the construction had a width of 24 m. It was laid out, with the exception of the section in the Teutoburg Forest, for speeds of at least 160 km / h.

The construction was carried out in parallel with the total of 12 locations. First, on 5 April 1936 the 32 km section between Braunschweig-West and Lehrte was opened to traffic. Three further sections between Hannover-Ost to Lehrte (10 km), Braunschweig-West to Helmstedt (43 km) and Werder / Groß Kreutz (located at the subsequent part of today's A 10) to Burg / Schermen (85 km) followed on 17 August 1936. On 10 January 1937 the Berlin Ring was connected to Hannover with the release of the 55 km long section between Burg / Schermen and Helmstedt. In 1937, the first section between Düsseldorf and Recklinghausen was opened in the western area on 17 December. The Kamener cross northeast of Dortmund, where the A 1 crosses the A 2, was on 12 November 1938, together with the section between Recklinghausen and Gütersloh the traffic passed, but still without the subsequent parts of today's A 1, the only after 1945 were put into operation. It was after the Schkeuditzer cross (A 9-A 14) a second intersection in cloverleaf execution in Germany. The also scheduled for this day traffic transfer of the section between Gütersloh and Bielefeld could not be performed due to a landslide in the Teutoburg Forest. Only after the damage had been eliminated on 15 December, you could drive this route. On the same day, the section was inaugurated until Bad Salzuflen and Herford. The day before, the section between Bad Nenndorf and Hannover had already been opened. Thus, only the section between Bad Salzuflen and Bad Nenndorf was missing. This was released on 23 September 1939 restricted. Due to the started World War II you could finish this section only once. Thus, this was provisionally intended only for the so-called service traffic. Under the operation of Polish forced laborers and prisoners of war, this section was built and opened until 14 November 1940, except for a three-kilometer stretch of the Weser crossing at Bad Oeynhausen, which was built after the war. Altogether 230 bridges were built in the course of the highway.

In the GDR, the highway was one of the transit routes, from 1971 in the context of the transit agreement. On a travel and traffic map of the GDR of 1979, the section of the highway between the border crossing Marienborn and the former branch Magdeburg (now motorway junction Werder) is only marked with a T for transit route, on a later map (Reiseland DDR 1988) with the still applicable E 30 designation. It played an important role as a transit corridor to West Berlin, with allied checkpoints at Helmstedt and Dreilinden-Drewitz (on the A 10) respectively.

In the beginning of the 1970s prepared numbering scheme of the federal highways carried the current A 2 in the former West Germany largely their current number, but ran west of the cross Oberhausen on the way of today's A 3 on to the motorway junction Heumar, the Berliner Ring coming Kilometrierung was even continued in a westerly direction to Aachen. From the introduction of today's numbering system in 1975, the A 2 already began at the Dutch border Straelen / Venlo and led from the intersection Kaiserberg together as A 2 and A 3 to the cross Oberhausen, where the A 3 in the direction of Arnhem again separated from the route. In the course of the numbering of the junctions, which began in 1992, double denominations of motorway junctions, motorway junctions and dual denominations such as the route between Duisburg and Oberhausen were classified as A 2 / A 3. The piece between Venlo and Duisburg is today part of the A 40.

Between the towns of Helmstedt and Marienborn one can still see the former border control points, which were turned into a museum in the 1990s.

Today
The Dortmund-Lanstrop junction has only been built to give access to the nearby landfill. Garbage trucks approach it via the autobahn, then exit via secondary roads.

Due to its importance as a major thoroughfare for commercial transit and as a trade route connecting the western parts of Germany to neighbouring Central European countries such as Poland, it is often nicknamed Warsaw Avenue or simply Poland Highway.

Christian Dzida, keyboardist for the Austrian band Schürzenjäger from 1995 to 1999, was killed in a road accident on Bundesautobahn 2 in November 2009.

Future
The A 2 is completely six-lane between the Ruhr area and Berlin. The last gap of several years of expansion was closed in mid-December 2011. During the long expansion phase, it came again and again to miles of traffic jams. Despite extensive security measures, there were always numerous serious rear-end collisions involving trucks.

At the end of October 2013, after 18 months of construction, the tank and service facility "Lipperland Nord" north of the junction Ostwestfalen / Lippe opened. The rest stop Lipperland Süd was already completed.

Lower Saxony and North Rhine-Westphalia want to expand the busy A 2 from Bielefeld to the border to Saxony-Anhalt eight lanes. In order to meet the expected increase in traffic, especially of trucks on the important east–west connection, both countries had notified the expansion for the Federal Transport Infrastructure Plan 2030. However, the final version of the corresponding demand plan, which came into force at the end of 2016 with the amendment of the Highway Act, now only includes the extension of the motorway triangle Bottrop and Hannover-West, the motorway junction Hannover-Buchholz and the eight-lane extension from Herrenhausen to AD Hannover-West as urgent needs with bottleneck elimination. Further needs are the eight-lane expansion of the sections Bad Nenndorf to Herrenhausen and Hannover-West to Hannover-East classified.

On the approximately 3.5-kilometer section between the interchange Hannover-Ost and Lehrte the side strips were equipped with emergency stop bays, structurally adapted and sold with block marking and released since 28 January in the direction of Berlin and 1 February in the opposite direction as Verflechtungsstreifen. Traffic is routed there via LED panels and supplemented variable message signs.

References

External links

lostplaces.de – border crossing Helmstedt-Marienborn 

002
A002
A002
A002
A002
Constituent roads of European route E30
Buildings and structures in Jerichower Land